The flathead grey mullet (Mugil cephalus) is an important food fish species in the mullet family Mugilidae. It is found in coastal tropical and subtropical waters worldwide.  Its length is typically . It is known with numerous English names, including the flathead mullet, striped mullet (US, American Fisheries Society name), black mullet, bully mullet, common mullet, grey mullet, sea mullet and mullet, among others.

The flathead grey mullet is a mainly diurnal coastal species that often enters estuaries and rivers. It usually schools over sand or mud bottoms, feeding on zooplankton, dead plant matter and detritus. The adult fish normally feed on algae in fresh water. The species is euryhaline, meaning that the fish can acclimate to different levels of salinity.

Description
The back of the fish is olive-green, sides are silvery and shade to white towards the belly. The fish may have six to seven distinctive lateral horizontal stripes. Lips are thin. The mullet has no lateral line.

Distribution 
The flathead mullet is cosmopolitan in coastal waters of the tropical, subtropical and temperate zones of all seas, as far north as the Bay of Biscay and Nova Scotia in the Atlantic Ocean.

Australia
In Australia, the fish is widespread, from Far North Queensland, around southern Australia to the Kimberley region of Western Australia. They also occur in the Bass Strait area of Tasmania. They live in tropical and temperate coastal marine and estuarine waters, but are also often found in the lower reaches of rivers. They are able to live in a wide range of salinity and so may also be found in lagoons, lakes and far into estuaries, but migrate back to the sea to spawn.

Western US freshwater occurrence
In freshwaters of the western United States, the striped mullet historically ranged far up the Colorado River to the vicinity of Blythe and up the Gila River to perhaps Tacna. Because of the dams and restricted flows to the Gulf of California, the range in Arizona is restricted to the Colorado River below Laguna Dam and the lower end of the Gila River when there is water present. They are often abundant in the mainstream and lateral canals in the Gila River region.

In the Colorado River mullet are pelagic in larger pools, sometimes moving into currents below dams, and generally occurring in small groups.

The mullet populations are currently declining in Arizona, due to periods when the Colorado River does not reach the Gulf of California.

Fisheries and aquaculture
The flathead grey mullet is an important food fish around the world, and it is both fished and farmed. The reported worldwide catches from fishing in 2012 were about 130,000 tonnes and aquaculture production was 142,000 tonnes.

Development 
The ontogeny of mugilid larvae has been well studied, with the larval development of Mugil cephalus in particular being studied intensively due to its wide range of distribution and interest to aquaculture. The previously understudied osteological development of Mugil cephalus was investigated in a 2021 study, with four embryonic and six larval developmental steps being described in aquaculture-reared and wild-caught specimens. These descriptions provided clarification of questionable characters of adult mullets and revealed informative details with potential implications for phylogenetic hypotheses, as well as providing an overdue basis of comparison for aquaculture-reared mullets to enable recognition of malformations.

Cuisine

The roe of this mullet is salted, dried, and compressed to make a specialty food across the world, such as Greek avgotaraho, Taiwanese Wuyutsu, Korean eoran, Japanese karasumi, Italian bottarga, French poutargue, Turkish Haviar and Egyptian batarekh. In Egypt, the fish itself is salted, dried, and pickled to make fesikh.

On the coast of Northwest Florida and Alabama, this mullet, called the striped or black mullet, is often a specialty of seafood restaurants. Fried mullet is most popular, but smoked, baked, and canned mullet are also eaten. Local fishermen usually catch mullet in a castnet, though most use a land-based seine net. Mullet is a delicacy in this area and is most often consumed in the home. Mullet are usually filleted, and the remaining frames used for fish stock, used in chowders and stews.  The mullet most commonly consumed in Florida however is the white mullet (Mugil curema), because its preference for cleaner water gives it a cleaner and less muddy taste.

References

External links
 

flathead grey mullet
Cosmopolitan fish
flathead grey mullet
flathead grey mullet